Kenneth William Tobin is an engineer at the Oak Ridge National Laboratory/ UT-Battelle LLC in Oak Ridge, Tennessee. He was named a Fellow of the Institute of Electrical and Electronics Engineers (IEEE) in 2012 for his contributions to computer vision technology for instrumentation and measurement.

References 

Fellow Members of the IEEE
Living people
Year of birth missing (living people)
Place of birth missing (living people)